The Nicaragua women's national under-17 basketball team is a national basketball team of Nicaragua, managed by the Federación Nicaraguense de Baloncesto.

It represents the country in international under-16 and under-17 (under age 16 and under age 17) women's basketball competitions.

It appeared at the 2011 COCABA U17 Championship for Women.

References

External links
Archived records of Nicaragua team participations

Basketball in Nicaragua
Basketball teams in Nicaragua
Women's national under-17 basketball teams
Basketball